Parvulastra vivipara, the Tasmanian live-bearing seastar, is a tiny, uniformly orange-yellow seastar, up to  across. The species usually has five short arms and is a rounded, pentagon shape. Morphological variation is common and three, four or six arms are occasionally present. It is endemic to coastal waters in southeast Tasmania.

Description
It is normally pentagonal in shape, with five stubby arms, but individuals sometimes occur with four or six arms. The aboral (upper) surface is a plain yellowish-orange.

Distribution and habitat
P. vivipara is endemic to the waters of south-eastern Tasmania. It is known from thirteen separate locations and because there is no planktonic larval stage, this species has limited scope for dispersal. Its total area of occupation is estimated to be under . One of these locations was as a result of an accidental introduction in 1995 when an aquarium population was liberated into the sea at Woodbridge due to a concern over their care during a holiday period.

Ecology
This starfish feeds on the microbial and algal film found on the surface of rocks. It does this by everting (pushing out) its stomach through its mouth, and digesting the film in situ. It feeds at night and on overcast days.

P. vivipara is a hermaphrodite, each individual typically having six to eight female gonads and a single male-type gonad. The seastars mostly self-fertilise, but it is likely that some cross fertilisation occurs. The embryos and juveniles are brooded within the mother's body cavity. They are present in various sizes, and usually leave the protective environment to live independently by the time they are 30% of the parent's diameter. They emerge through gonopores on the aboral surface of the parent, the holes enlarging to let them out. While they are inside the body cavity, they are cannibalistic, the larger ones eating the smaller ones; sometimes one becomes too large to emerge, and remains inside its mother.

Status
The Department of the Environment of the Australian Government is concerned about the conservation of this species. Threats it has identified include competition from introduced seastar species, predation by these seastars, pollution by sewage, industrial and agricultural discharges, and habitat destruction.

References

Asterinidae
Fauna of the Pacific Ocean
Marine fauna of Australia
Endemic fauna of Tasmania
Animals described in 1969